Hippidion (meaning little horse) is an extinct genus of equine that lived in South America from the Late Pliocene to the end of the Late Pleistocene (Lujanian), between two million and 11,000 years ago. They were one of two lineages of equines native to South America during the Pleistocene epoch, alongside those of the Equus subgenus Amerhippus.

Taxonomy

Evolution 

Hippidion has been considered a descendant of pliohippines, equines that migrated into the South American continent around 2.5 million years ago. Early analysis of the ancient DNA of Hippidion and other New World Pleistocene equines supported the novel hypothesis that Hippidion was actually a member of the living genus Equus, with a particularly close relationship to the wild horse, Equus ferus. However this was later shown to be incorrect, with more complete sequences finding Hippidion as an outgroup to all living equines and less closely related to living equines than the "New World stilt legged horse", Haringtonhippus francisci.

Hippidion is traditionally thought to have 3 species, H. principale, H. saldiasi and H. devillei, however, in a 2015 DNA analysis, the single sampled H. principale specimen was found to be nested with H. saldiasi, with H. devillei found to be clearly genetically distinct.

Hippidion and other South American equines became extinct approximately 8,000 years ago. Specific archaeological recovery at the Cueva del Milodon site in Patagonian Chile demonstrates that Hippidion saldiasi existed in that vicinity in the era of 10,000 to 12,000 years before present, making it the last surviving member of its species. Equines did not reappear in South America until the 16th century, as a result of introduction by humans.

Description 

The skull of Hippidion is noted for its nasal bone, which projects forward from the skull.

Paleobiology

Diet and ecology 

A study found that Late Pleistocene specimens of Hippidion had lower δ13C values than those of specimens of Amerhippus, indicating a preference for C3 woodland and wooded open habitats. H. principale is suggested to have been a mixed feeder (both browsing and grazing), as opposed to the grazing diet of the contemporary Equus neogeus.

Distribution 
Remains of Hippidion saldiasi have been recovered in locations such as the Piedra Museo site, Santa Cruz, Argentina and Cueva del Milodon, Chile. The significance of such archaeological recovery is amplified by the association with hunting of these animals by prehistoric man at possible Pre-Clovis horizons.

Fossils of Hippidion have been found in:

Pleistocene
 Tarija, Ñuapua and Ulloma Formations, Bolivia
 Jandaíra Formation, Brazil
 Chíu-Chíu Formation, Cueva del Milodón, Chile
 Tierra del Fuego, Magallanes Province and its borders with Argentine
 Sopas and Dolores Formations, Uruguay
 Taima-Taima, Venezuela

Extinction 
Hippidion became extinct alongside the other South American equines at the end of the Late Pleistocene, between 15,000 and 10,000 years ago as part of the Quaternary extinction event, which resulted in the extinction of most large animals in both North and South America. Climatic modelling suggests that the preferred habitat for species of Hippidion declined after the Holocene transition, but the decline is not enough to explain the extinction.

References 

Pliocene horses
Pleistocene horses
Pliocene first appearances
Pleistocene genus extinctions
Prehistoric placental genera
Pleistocene mammals of South America
Pliocene mammals of South America
Uquian
Ensenadan
Lujanian
Pleistocene Argentina
Fossils of Argentina
Pleistocene Bolivia
Fossils of Bolivia
Pleistocene Brazil
Fossils of Brazil
Pleistocene Chile
Fossils of Chile
Pleistocene Uruguay
Fossils of Uruguay
Pleistocene Venezuela
Fossils of Venezuela
Fossil taxa described in 1869